Magnolia liliifera, commonly known as egg magnolia, is a flowering tree native to the Indomalayan realm. It bears white to cream-colored flowers on terminal stems.

Varieties
Magnolia liliifera was classified as having several varieties, however these have now been generally accepted as species by several botanists including Hans Peter Nooteboom and Richard B. Figlar according to data compiled by Rafaël Govaerts, a researcher for the WCSP at Kew Gardens.

 Magnolia liliifera var. angatensis (Blanco) Noot, also accepted as Magnolia angatensis Blanco
 Magnolia liliifera var. beccarii (Ridley) Noot., also accepted as Magnolia beccarii (Ridl.) ined.
 Magnolia liliifera var. championii, (Benth.) Pamp also accepted as Magnolia championii Benth..
 Magnolia liliifera var. obovata (Korth.), also accepted as Magnolia hodgsonii (Hook.f. & Thom.) H.Keng (Note: Magnolia obovata is used for a distantly related species from a different section of Magnolia.)
 Magnolia liliifera var. singapurensis (Ridl.) Govaerts, also accepted as Magnolia singapurensis (Ridl.) H.Keng

Cultivation

Magnolia liliifera is grown as an ornamental plant and is suited to culture in pots. Although tropical, the egg magnolia is reported to withstand sub-tropical climates at USDA zone 10 and higher. It has been grown in the West since the Victorian era with the first report of a flowering specimen at Kew Gardens in April, 1862. The egg magnolia is valued for its fragrant, egg-like flower which releases a wafting pineapple-like scent in the morning.

See also
 Magnolia hodgsonii
 Talauma

References

External links

 Top Tropicals Guide - Magnolia liliifera

liliifera
Taxa named by Carl Linnaeus
Taxa named by Henri Ernest Baillon